Lauren Marie Gardner is an American engineer who is an associate professor and co-director of the Center for Systems Science and Engineering at Johns Hopkins University. She created the Johns Hopkins University dashboard that is used to share information about the COVID-19 pandemic.

Gardner was included in Times 100 Most Influential People of 2020.

Early life and education 
In 2006, Gardner received a B.S.Arch.E. in architectural engineering from the University of Texas at Austin. In 2008, she received an M.S.E. in civil engineering, also from UT-Austin. In 2011, Gardner earned her PhD in Transportation Engineering from the University of Texas at Austin. Her dissertation was on the topic of Network Prediction Models for Coupled Transportation-Epidemiological Systems.

Research and career 
In 2011, Gardner was appointed a lecturer at the University of New South Wales (UNSW). She was a member of the UNSW Research Centre for Integrated Transport Innovation. This team coined the phrase “bio-secure mobility” to describe the new line of research pursued by Gardner. In summary, Gardner explores how people and things moving around our globalised world spread infectious disease. Her research considers the relationship between epidemiology and transport, making use of network optimisation to describe the spread of disease.

She looked to avoid pandemics by identifying high-risk shipping and air traffic routes. She worked on a computer model that could help government officials in the United States better assess which passengers are likely to suffer from infectious disease and virus outbreaks, and to help them decide where and when to screen passengers. Her models make use of air travel data, the suitability of habitats to vectors, the local transmission of a virus and passenger air travel data. She used the model to analyse the 2015–16 Zika virus epidemic in the Americas.

During this same time, Gardner was a research fellow with the Australian Government's National Health and Medical Research Council (NHMRC) Centres of Research Excellence (CRE) in Population Health Research at the School of Public Health and Community Medicine at the University of Melbourne.

In 2019, Gardner moved back to United States to work at Johns Hopkins University, where she serves as Associate Professor and Co-Director of the Center for Systems Science and Engineering. Here she has studied the United States counties that are most at risk of measles outbreaks. Her analysis concluded that Los Angeles, King County, Washington and Miami-Dade County, Florida were most likely to suffer a measles outbreak .

During the COVID-19 pandemic, Gardner recognised that the public, researchers and health authorities needed clear, accessible and up-to-date information. Gardner and her first-year graduate student, Ensheng Dong, created an interactive dashboard that debuted on January 22, 2020. During March 2020, the platform was accessed 1.2 billion times per day. In 2020 Gardner briefed the United States Congress on the COVID-19 pandemic in the United States.

Honors
 2006-2010: Engineering Thrust Fellowship
 2008, 2009, 2010: Eisenhower Transportation Fellowship
 2010: Robert Herman Endowed Scholarship
 2010: WTS Heart of Texas Chapter Scholarship for the Helene M. Overly Memorial Scholarship
 2012: UNSW Sydney, Staff Excellence Award
 2020: Gardner was on the list of the BBC's 100 Women announced on 23 November 2020.
 2022: Lasker-Bloomberg Public Service Award

Selected works and publications

Works

Publications

References

External links
 Lauren Gardner at Whiting School of Engineering, Johns Hopkins University
 COVID-19 Dashboard by the Center for Systems Science and Engineering (CSSE) at Johns Hopkins University (JHU)

Living people
Year of birth missing (living people)
Johns Hopkins University faculty
Women epidemiologists
University of Texas at Austin alumni
BBC 100 Women
American epidemiologists
21st-century American scientists
21st-century American women scientists